Dead Man's Switch is a Big Finish Productions audio drama featuring Lisa Bowerman as Bernice Summerfield, a character from the spin-off media based on the long-running British science fiction television series Doctor Who.

Plot 
Benny continues to fight to get  home, but what is so important about the world of Zordin? What is trying to escape from there?

Cast
Bernice Summerfield - Lisa Bowerman
Matka - Maria McErlane
Otek - William Whymper
Robot - Alex Mallinson

Trivia
This is the final Bernice Summerfield audio with artwork by Adrian Salmon, and the final audio to use the old numbering system. Starting with The Kraken's Lament the brand is rebooted, though it is a continuation of the same story.

External links
- Professor Bernice Summerfield: Dead Man's Switch

Dead Man's Switch
Fiction set in the 27th century